Kelly is a fictional character from the comic book series The Walking Dead and the television series of the same name, where she is portrayed by Angel Theory.

Comic book series
Kelly is part of Magna's group who joins the Alexandria Safe-Zone Community two years after the Savior war ends. After they came across the herd being led by Jesus, Kelly and his group return to Alexandria with him to meet with Rick. He argues with Magna and says they should not trust the Alexandria Safe-Zone group and blames them for Bernie's death in which Magna defends them. Later, after being interviewed by Andrea, Kelly debates with his group and believes the Alexandria Safe-Zone Community is hiding something.

Television series

Season 9
In the episode "What Comes After", a small group of survivors, Magna, Connie, Kelly, Yumiko, and Luke are trying to hold off a walker horde when a few are shot from a forest nearby. The group is told to take cover, and find that they have been rescued by a now-preteen Judith Grimes who wears Carl's hat and is armed with Rick's revolver and a katana like Michonne. In the episode "Who Are You Now?", Kelly and the others arrive in Alexandria and speak to the council, but Michonne instead escorts them to Hilltop. In the episode "Stradivarius", Kelly and her group travel to Hilltop, and Michonne leaves them to return to Alexandria. In the mid-season finale "Evolution", Kelly and the group arrive at Hilltop.

In the episode "Omega", Tara leads Magna, Yumiko, Connie, and Kelly to search for Alden and Luke, aware that they may encounter more people like Lydia that wear walker disguises. That night, Magna's group try to find the tracks again, they start to hear walkers. Magna then suggests that they need to return, but Kelly states that they should find Luke, who she has an emotional attachment to; Connie opts to stay with Kelly. Unbeknownst to them, a Whisperer secretly watches them. On a guard post, Yumiko apologizes to Tara for leaving. Tara accepts and tells Yumiko to talk to her next time, and informs her that the guards had seen them leave and that she had sent out a party to find and recover them, not wanting to see anyone else hurt. As they watch the guards bring Kelly and Connie back just outside the Hilltop gate, they spot a small group of Whisperers approaching the Hilltop. The guards then grab Kelly to get her safely inside, but are separated from Connie, who hides and takes shelter in the nearby cornfield. In the episode "Bounty", Connie escapes back into the cornfield and is helped back into the Hilltop by Daryl, Kelly, Tammy, and Earl. In the episode "Chokepoint", Tara worries that Daryl's group hasn't arrived, and she leads an expedition to locate them, accompanied by Yumiko, Magna, Kelly, Tammy, and Earl, fighting walkers along the way. In the episode "The Calm Before", Kelly and Connie attend the fair at the Kingdom.

Season 10
In the season premiere "Lines We Cross", Kelly helps form a militia. In the episode "Silence the Whisperers", Kelly helps deal with a herd. In the episode "What It Always Is", Yumiko receives reports that supplies have been missing, while Kelly, with slight hearing loss, has gotten separated from her hunting party, which concerns her deaf and mute sister Connie. Daryl and Connie go to search for her, but are also being followed by Magna. They eventually find Kelly near a stash of supplies that she and Magna have been taking from the Hilltop, as they do not yet fully trust the community. In the episode "The World Before", Daryl, Carol, and Aaron set out and meet with Jerry, Magna, Connie, and Kelly to locate the horde. In the first part finale "Squeeze", Daryl, Carol, Aaron, Jerry, Connie, Kelly, and Magna are in the cave surrounded by a gargantuan horde of walkers. Kelly and Aaron escape, but are attacked by awaiting Whisperers, who they kill.

In the second part premiere "Morning Star", Jerry and Kelly tell Ezekiel about the events at the mine. In the episode "Walk with Us", when Mary, Alden, Kelly, and Adam are confronted by walkers, Mary lures them away only to be killed by Beta. In the episode "The Tower", outside the hospital, Carol and Kelly scavenge wires from some cars during an errand for Luke. While scavenging, Carol apologizes to Kelly about her actions in the cave, but Kelly thinks nothing of it and believes that Connie is still alive. In the second part finale "A Certain Doom", Daryl, Carol, Jerry, Magna, Luke, Kelly, Beatrice, and Jules decide to venture through the horde covered in walker guts to engineer the escape plan.

In the third part premiere "Home Sweet Home", Maggie, Daryl, Kelly, and two of Maggie's people, Cole and Elijah, head off to find the rest of Maggie's group, the Wardens, at a rendezvous point. The following morning, Kelly is discovered to have abandoned her post while on watch; the group find her in the woods searching for Connie. Amidst the chaos, Maggie is able to free herself and Kelly manages to wound the Reaper using Daryl's crossbow; the group surround the attacker.

Season 11
In the season premiere "Acheron: Part I", Kelly is part of a group who raid the abandoned Fort Connors for food supplies. In the episode "Hunted", outside of Alexandria, Carol, Rosita, Magna, and Kelly retrieve some of the community's escaped horses. Though many of the horses have been killed by walkers, the group finds four surviving horses and secure them at an abandoned farm. In the episode "On the Inside", Connie and Virgil shelter in a house they find in the woods while on the run from walkers, while in another forested area Kelly searches for Connie. Kelly comes across a camp in the woods that Connie stayed at with Virgil, finding a small journal Connie was keeping. She is eventually joined by Carol, Rosita, and Magna, who are annoyed that Kelly didn't tell anyone where she was going before she left, but agree to help her look for Connie. Kelly, Carol, Rosita, and Magna run over to Connie, as the two sisters embrace. In the first part finale "For Blood", Connie and Kelly opt to help Aaron rebuild the wall, while Rosita stays behind to watch over the children in the house.

Development and reception
Angel Theory was cast as Kelly, Connie's protective sister and a member of Magna's group. Theory trained as a dancer in multiple styles of dance at the Broadway Dance Center, EXPG studios and Peridance Studios.

References

The Walking Dead (franchise) characters